The 1996 Triple J Hottest 100, counted down in January 1997, was a countdown of the most popular songs of the year, according to listeners of the Australian radio station Triple J. A CD featuring 31 of the songs was released. A countdown of the videos of most of the songs was also shown on the ABC music series Rage. The 1996 chart marked the first time an Australian band had topped the chart, with Spiderbait taking out top honours.

Full list

29 of the 100 songs were by Australian artists (marked with a green background).

Artists with multiple entries
Three entries
Bush (5, 19, 38)
Powderfinger (6, 18, 32)
The Smashing Pumpkins (13, 28, 55)
Pearl Jam (47, 90, 94)
Two entries
The Prodigy (7, 17)
Regurgitator (15, 23)
The Fauves (20, 30)
Ash (22, 85)
Everclear (24, 58)
Beck (29, 43)
Eels (39, 56)
Garbage (40, 51)
Metallica (52, 62)
You Am I (80, 84)

CD release

Note: "Milk" is actually the Shirley and Tricky single edit instead of the Shirley single edit listed on the track listing.

A later release omits "Stinkfist", "Down", "Just a Girl", "The Distance", and "Devils Haircut", while including "Disco 2000" by Pulp, "Self Abuser" by The Fauves, and "A Punch in the Face" by Frenzal Rhomb.

Certifications

See also
1996 in music

References

1996
1996 in Australian music
1996 record charts